Hannah Miles (born 13 April 1998) is a Welsh footballer who plays as a midfielder for Cardiff City and the Wales national team.

Playing career

Club
Miles joined FA WSL 1 side Yeovil Town on 17 September 2017, alongside Welsh international teammate Laura O'Sullivan.

International
, Miles has earned eight caps with the Wales national team. In 2017, she made an appearance during the qualifying phase of the UEFA Women's Euro 2017.

References

External links

1998 births
Living people
Welsh women's footballers
Wales women's international footballers
Cardiff City Ladies F.C. players
Yeovil Town L.F.C. players
Women's association football midfielders